

The Akaflieg Darmstadt D-38 is a German, single-seat, Standard Class sailplane that was designed and built by the Fliegergruppe of Darmstadt University.

Design
The D-38 is a cantilever, shoulder-wing monoplane with a glassfibre/balsa sandwich shell structure fuselage and wing, the wing has no flaps and has a T-tail. The pilot has a semi-reclining seat in an enclosed cockpit with a transparent canopy and the landing gear is a manual retracting monowheel gear with a tailskid. The D-38 was, in effect, the prototype of the successful Glaser-Dirks DG-100 competition Standard class glider.

Specifications

See also

References

Notes

Bibliography

External links
Akaflieg Darmstadt website

1970s German sailplanes
Akaflieg Darmstadt aircraft
Shoulder-wing aircraft
Aircraft first flown in 1972